The McPherson County Courthouse in McPherson, Kansas is an historic three-story courthouse that was built in 1893.  It was added to the National Historic Register in 1976.

It was designed by architect John G. Haskell.  The building was built in 1893.

It is Richardsonian Romanesque in style and is built of Cottonwood Limestone from quarries near Strong City in Chase County. The main entrance of the courthouse is in the base of the tower and features a Syrian arch.

References

Courthouses on the National Register of Historic Places in Kansas
Government buildings completed in 1893
Buildings and structures in McPherson County, Kansas
County courthouses in Kansas
Clock towers in Kansas
National Register of Historic Places in McPherson County, Kansas